Edward Bill (13 October 1902 – 1 March 1957) was a Polish footballer. He played in one match for the Poland national football team in 1927.

See also 

 Football in Poland

References

External links
 

1902 births
1957 deaths
Polish footballers
Poland international footballers
Place of birth missing
Association football midfielders
MKS Cracovia (football) players